Sam Lloyd (November 12, 1963 – April 30, 2020) was an American actor and singer, best known for his portrayal of lawyer Ted Buckland on the comedy-drama series Scrubs and the sitcom Cougar Town.

Early life
Lloyd was born in Springfield, Vermont, on November 12, 1963, the son of Marianna McGuffin and Samuel Lloyd Sr., an actor. One of five siblings—which included Laurel, Robin, Sandra, and Jackson—he was the nephew of actor Christopher Lloyd.

He attended Syracuse University in the 1980s. There he starred in friend Paul Perry's student film Fan Mail, which Lloyd described as a "clever, fun, kind of homage to silent films".

Career
Lloyd is best known for his portrayal of lawyer Ted Buckland on the comedy-drama series Scrubs and the sitcom Cougar Town. He and his uncle both guest-starred on Malcolm in the Middle: Lloyd as a housing lawyer, and his uncle as Hal's father. The two also guested on The West Wing: Lloyd requesting the White House to release information about UFOs, and his uncle as a constitutional law expert. He also appeared in Desperate Housewives as Albert Goldfine. Aside from acting, Lloyd was an accomplished singer with the a cappella group the Blanks, who made many appearances on Scrubs under the name The Worthless Peons (also known as Ted's Band). He also played the bass guitar in a Beatles tribute group called the Butties; although right-handed, he learned to play bass left-handed like Beatles bassist Paul McCartney to maintain authenticity.

Illness and death
In January 2019, Lloyd was diagnosed with an inoperable brain tumor, which was subsequently revealed to be metastatic lung cancer that had spread to his liver, spine, and jaw. His wife Vanessa had given birth to their son, Weston, around the time Lloyd received his diagnosis. He died in Los Angeles on April 30, 2020, at the age of 56.

Filmography

Film

Television

References

External links

 

1963 births
2020 deaths
20th-century American male actors
21st-century American male actors
American male film actors
Deaths from lung cancer in California
American people of English descent
American tenors
American male television actors
Deaths from brain cancer in the United States
Male actors from Vermont
Syracuse University alumni
People from Weston, Vermont
Singers from Vermont
20th-century American male singers
20th-century American singers
21st-century American male singers
21st-century American singers